Seljametsa is a village in Pärnu urban municipality, Pärnu County in southwestern Estonia. Prior to the administrative reform of Estonian local governments in 2017, the village belonged to Paikuse Parish.

References

 

Villages in Pärnu County